Susheela Raman (born 21 July 1973) is a British musician. She was nominated for the 2006 BBC World Music Awards.  Her debut album Salt Rain was nominated for the Mercury Prize in 2001. She is known for energetic, vibrant, syncretic, and uplifting live performances built on the sacred Bhakti and Sufi traditions of India and Pakistan.

Biography

Early years
Susheela Raman's parents are Tamils from Thanjavur in Tamil Nadu, India, who arrived in London, UK in the mid-1960s. At the age of four, Raman and her family left the UK for Australia. Susheela grew up singing Carnatic music and began giving recitals at an early age. She recalls how her family "were eager to keep our Tamil culture alive." As a teenager in Sydney she started her own band, describing its sound as "funk and rock and roll", before branching out into more blues and jazz-based music, which demanded quite different voice techniques. She tried to bring these streams together when in 1995 she travelled to India to rediscover her roots by way of further exploring Carnatic music.

Music career
Returning to England in 1997, she started to work with her partner, guitarist/producer Sam Mills who had recorded "Real Sugar" with a Bengali singer named Paban Das Baul. According to Raman "it bridged a gap and found common ground for one particular kind of Indian music to be expressed to a new audience." In 1999, Raman co-wrote songs for the album One and One is One by Joi, also performing on the track "Asian Vibes." Mills had worked with West African musicians in the group Tama which also opened musical contact points within the Parisian music scene.

Salt Rain
After a period of three years collaborating with Sam Mills, Raman released her first album Salt Rain in 2001 on Narada, an American subsidiary of EMI.

The album went gold in France and in the UK was shortlisted for the Mercury Music Prize. Raman also won the Best Newcomer award from BBC Radio 3.

Salt Rain drew on traditional Tamil music blended with jazz-folk and pop influences. It featured original material, as well as old songs Raman sang at recitals when younger.

Love Trap
In 2003 Raman released her second album Love Trap which featured amongst other collaborators the Nigerian drummer Tony Allen and Tuvan singer Albert Kuvezin of the group Yat-Kha.

The title track is a re-interpretation of an Ethiopian song by Mahmoud Ahmed.

Music for Crocodiles
Music for Crocodiles, Raman's third album, was released in 2005. It had been partly recorded in Chennai (Madras), India. The album included "The Same Song" which was used by Mira Nair for the end credits of her film The Namesake. (Nair also used Raman's version of the 1960s Hindi film song "Ye Mera Divanapan Hai" from the previous album).

On Music for Crocodiles Raman sang for the first time in French on "L'Ame Volatile".

Raman's training in Carnatic classical music makes its presence felt in Tamil classical titles such as "Sharavana," her singing "Meanwhile" (on the same album) in a rāgam called Kanakaangi, and in the song "Light Years" which features a melody in Kalyani rāgam as well as the veena playing of Punya 'Devi' Srinivas.

In 2006 Susheela was again nominated for a BBC World Music Award and was the subject of a one-hour documentary by French-German TV Channel Arte, called Indian Journey directed by Mark Kidel.

33
Susheela's deal with Narada ended in 2006 and that year she independently recorded an album 33, a set of re-imaginings of tracks from the nineteen sixties and seventies. Artists covered include Bob Dylan, John Lennon, The Velvet Underground, Captain Beefheart, Jimi Hendrix, Can and Throbbing Gristle. The album features long term collaborators Sam Mills on guitar, Vincent Segal on cello, and tabla player and percussionist Aref Durvesh.

The album was released in April 2007 in France on the independent label XIII Bis.

2008 to 2010
Raman garnered acclaim for her live performances. She continued to research and discover music from Tamil Nadu, studying in 2007 with the Bhakti singer Kovai Kamla.

Vel
In 2011, Raman released Vel, marking a change in musical direction which was well received.

She followed this up with a series of concerts which showcased her new musical direction, demonstrating, as her reviewers put it "a rousing comeback".

2011 to 2013

Through 2011 to 2013, Raman worked with Sufi Qawali singers and musicians in Lahore in addition to Rajasthani musicians, and continued to explore ecstatic and devotional musical styles.

In 2013, Raman returned to the stage in London at the Royal Festival Hall as part of the Alchemy Festival, having previously played at the Jaipur Literary Festival.

Queen Between
In September 2013 Susheela Raman announced a new album, as yet untitled, inviting pledges from fans to ensure its release in spring 2014. Of this she said: "The record I am making now reflects my work in recent years living in London but travelling to work with master musicians from India and Pakistan. It features master musicians from Rajasthan, and spectacular Sufi Qawwali singers from Pakistan. In addition to my longstanding companions guitarist/producer Sam Mills and tabla demon Aref Durvesh, Fela Kuti’s legendary drummer Tony Allen and French cellist Vincent Ségal also make an appearance. It is a really exciting album with singing in English, Tamil, Panjabi, Urdu, Marwari and Bengali. It has some amazing playing and guest vocals by Kutle Khan and Rizwan Muazzam. It’s a big, beautiful, ambitious, groundbreaking album and ... it’s all about the songs.
It’s a work in progress and a strong start has been made. While the Qawals and Rajasthanis were in London this April we had some great sessions and laid down the basic recording for about nine tracks so far and now are looking for funding to complete the recording and editing, to mix, master and then to promote the album."

The album was finally released on 1 March 2014 as Queen Between.

Discography
 Salt Rain (2001) No. 29 FRA
 Love Trap (2003) No. 32 FRA
 Music for Crocodiles (2005) No. 51 FRA
 33 (2007) No. 120 FRA
 Vel (2011)
 Queen Between (2014)
 Ghost Gamelan (2018)
 Gypsy (2020)

Video
 "Vodoo child"
 "You do right / Bolo bolo"
  ‘Ganapati’ (dir/DOP: Andrew Catlin) (2001)
 ‘Salt Rain’ (dir/DOP: Andrew Catlin) (2001)
 ‘Maya’ (dir/DOP: Andrew Catlin) (2002)
 MTV Unplugged (India): Episode 5 – Susheela Raman – Ennapane

Narration
Other than music, she is well known for narrating documentaries, including BBC's Mountains of the Monsoon.

References

External links

 Official website
 Music for Crocodiles CD Review
 Susheela Raman Biography
 Susheela Raman feature
 Susheela Raman First date of the VEL French Tour 2011

1973 births
Living people
Narada Productions artists
English people of Indian descent
Tamil musicians
Indian Tamil people
British Hindus
English people of Indian Tamil descent
People from Hendon
Women Carnatic musicians
Carnatic musicians
English jazz musicians
English blues musicians
English trance musicians
English emigrants to Australia
21st-century English women singers
21st-century English singers